Highway 309 is a highway in the Canadian province of Saskatchewan. It runs from Highway 9 near Ebenezer to Highway 637 in Rhein.

References

309